Fiorella Alcira Pacheco Cabrera (born 8 August 1985) is a Peruvian former footballer who played as a goalkeeper. She has been a member of the Peru women's national team.

International career
Pacheco capped for Peru at senior level during two Copa América Femenina editions (2003 and 2006).

References

External links

1985 births
Living people
Peruvian women's footballers
Peru women's international footballers
Women's association football goalkeepers